Zane Duquemin (born 23 September 1991) is an athlete representing Jersey and Great Britain who specialises in the shot put and discus throw. He competed at three consecutive Commonwealth Games starting in 2010.

His sister, Shadine Duquemin, competes in the same events as Zane.

International competitions

Personal bests
Outdoor
Shot put – 19.42 (Hässleholm 2013)
Discus throw – 63.46 (Hendon 2012)
Indoor
Shot put – 18.86 (Växjö 2014)

References

1991 births
Living people
Jersey athletes
British male discus throwers
Commonwealth Games competitors for Jersey
Athletes (track and field) at the 2010 Commonwealth Games
Athletes (track and field) at the 2014 Commonwealth Games
Athletes (track and field) at the 2018 Commonwealth Games
British Athletics Championships winners
British male shot putters